is a five-member Japanese boy band under Johnny & Associates. The group's former name was A.B.C., which stands for Acrobat Boys Club. It was changed to A.B.C-Z after Ryosuke Hashimoto was moved to the group from J.J.Express in 2008. Due to the Japanese pronunciations of their name, the fans usually refer to them as "Ebi".

The group was a former Johnny's Jr. unit. They debuted February 1, 2012 with their DVD Za ABC ~5 Stars~.

History

2001–2008: As A.B.C.
Members:
Koichi Goseki
Shota Totsuka
Ryoichi Tsukada
Fumito Kawai

In 2002 they became A.B.C. with Yoshikazu Toshin.

2008–2011: A.B.C-Z pre-debut
In the Summer of 2008, it was announced that Ryosuke Hashimoto, who was a member of J.J.Express would join A.B.C., thus the group name changed to A.B.C-Z, their name is an acronym for "Acrobatics Boys Club Z" the Z symbolizing the last member coming into the group and completing them like Z completes the alphabet. Right after that, they held a concert, along with Kis-My-Ft2. 

In May 2010 they were allowed to hold their concert at Theater Crea in Tokyo. It was also the first time they produced their concert. They had their solo live from May 11 until 19th and then other units from Johnny's Jr. will take part in, and hold four different kinds of the show in total until May 31.

On July 23, 2011, during the PLAYZONE'11 musical, Fumito Kawai broke his left leg, causing him not to be able to appear for the rest of the show. After PLAYZONE'11 A.B.C-Z was scheduled to be in the stage play Shonentachi Koushi Naki Rougoku. Johnny H. Kitagawa was at the opening of this show and revealed a new group of seven, ABC-xyZ, centered on the already existing four-member group A.B.C-Z. He also hinted that things could get going by 2012, but for that Kawai needs to get better first.

On November 6 they held their first one-man concert at Tokyo's Yoyogi National Stadium for 26,000 fans. They also announced that in February next year they will be hosting a play, titled “ABC-za Star Kouen”, at Nissay Theater in Tokyo. Johnny H. Kitagawa commented that they may debut the next year.

On December 9 A.B.C-Z held a press conference for their upcoming stage play “ABC-za Star Kouen”. They also announced that they will be debuting in 2012 with a DVD. This would make them the first Johny's to do so. They hope to release the DVD before the opening of their stage play on February 4. It is said that the DVD will be released under Johnny's Entertainment. By the end of December the release date, February 1st, 2012, was then made public, along with the content of the DVD.

2012–2018: Debut and 5th anniversary
A.B.C-Z made their debut in 31st January at Shibuya AX which gathered 15.000 fans. Their DVD debut got number 1 in Oricon weekly ranking. In July, their variety show "ABChanZoo" starts broadcasting in TV Tokyo.

In June 2014, the first drama of A.B.C-Z members "Magical Boy Cherry's" starts broadcasting in TV Tokyo.

In September 2015, A.B.C-Z released their first single "Moonlight Walker" which got number 1 in Oricon weekly ranking.

4 years after their debut, in July 2016 A.B.C-Z established their official Fan Club

A.B.C-Z celebrated 5th anniversary of the group's debut in 2017 by releasing the single "Reboot!!!" and an album "5 Performer-z", followed by the "A.B.C-Z 5Stars 5Years Tour".

In 2018 A.B.C-Z celebrated their 10th year of the group formation and did a collaboration event with amusement park "Tokyo Joypolis", the event was called "A.B.C-Z 5stars CIRCUS in JOYPOLIS". The group also released a new single "JOYしたいキモチ" for this collaboration event.

2019
A.B.C-Z held their last concert of the Love Battle Tour in Yokohama Arena on January 8, they announced a new single "Black Sugar" which will be released on March 28. They also announced a new drama "Our Showtime" that will be airing in Nagoya TV on April, the theme song for the drama is A.B.C-Z song "Showtime" from the single "Black Sugar".

The group released their 6th album on August 7th "Going With Zephyr", followed by the tour with the same title as their album. Their collaboration event with the amusement park "Tokyo Joypolis" continued for the second year in a row.

Current members
Ryosuke Hashimoto - 橋本良亮 (born July 15, 1993 - red)
Fumito Kawai - 河合郁人 (born October 20, 1987 - violet)
Shota Totsuka - 戸塚祥太 (born November 13, 1986 - pink)
Ryoichi Tsukada - 塚田僚一 (born December 10, 1986 - yellow)
Koichi Goseki - 五関晃一 (born June 17, 1985 - blue)

Discography

Albums
 [2014.03.12] from ABC to Z 
 [2015.05.13] A.B.Sea Market
 [2016.07.20] ABC Star Line
 [2017.06.21] 5 Performer-Z
[2018.05.23] VS 5
[2019.08.07] Going With Zephyr

Compilation Albums
[2010.07.28] PLAYZONE2010 ROAD TO PLAYZONE
[2011.07.20] PLAYZONE'11 SONG&DANC'N.

Singles
[2015.09.30] Moonlight walker
[2016.06.22] Take a "5" Train
[2017.02.01] Reboot!!! 
[2017.12.13] 終電を超えて〜Christmas Night/忘年会!BOU!NEN!KAI!
[2018.08.29] JOYしたいキモチ
[2019.03.27] Black Sugar

Compilation Singles
[2010.08.18] ROAD TO PLAYZONE

DVD
Original DVDs

Music Videos

Live Tour DVDs

Musical/Stage Play DVDs

Other DVDs
[2010.09.22] 
[2010.11.10] "PLAYZONE2010 ROAD TO PLAYZONE"
[2011.04.13] 
[2011.06.08] 
[2011.11.02] "PLAYZONE’11 SONG & DANC’N."

Pre-debut songs
A to Z
Ashita no Tame ni Boku ga Iru
Attraction!
Crazy Accel
Crush
Daybreaker (with Kis-My-Ft2)
Dream ~Itsutsu no Negai~
Freedom
InaZuma☆Venus
Kodoku no RUNAWAY
Let's Go!! ~Mirai he Kakaru Hashi~ (TakiCHANnel opening theme)
Naked (with Question?)
Sayonara Box
Star Seeker
Vanilla
You&Me&Who? (Track on Shounentai's Playzone 'CHANGE' album, with M.A.D.)

Group activities

Variety shows
Shounen Club 「ザ少年倶楽部」(2008–present)
J Journeys A.B.C-Z Working Holiday [J'J A.B.C-Z オーストラリア縦断 資金0円ワーホリの旅] (2013.04.01 - 06.17)
ABChanZoo 「えびチャンズ」(2013.07.21 - present)

Drama
Magical Boy Cherry's「魔法☆男子チェリーズ」(2014.06.21 - 09.21)

Radio
 A.B.C-Z Go!Go!5 (FM NACK5) (2015.04 - present)
A.B.C-Z今夜はJ's倶楽部 (NHK) (2016.08 - present)
ダイヤルA.B.C☆E (TBS Radio) (2016.09 - 2017.03)

Stage Play
 Shinshun Takizawa Kakumei (2009.01)
 Dream Boys (2009.09.04 - 10.25)
 She Loves Me (2009.12.12 - 2010.01.31)
 Shinsun Takizawa Kakumei (2010.01)
 Takizawa Kabuki (2010.04 - 05)
 PLAYZONE 2010 ~ROAD TO PLAYZONE~ (2010.07 - 08)
 Shounentachi with Kis-My-Ft2 (2010.09)
 Shinsun Takizawa Kakumei (2011.01)
 PLAYZONE’11 SONG & DANC’N (2011.08)
 Shounentachi (2011.09)
 ABC座 星（スター）劇場 (2012.02)
 Shounentachi (2012.09)
 ABC座 2013 ジャニーズ伝説 (2013.10)
 ABC座 2014 ジャニーズ伝説 (2014.05)
 ABC座 2015 (2015.10)
 ABC座 2016 株式会社 応援屋!!〜OH&YEAH!!〜 (2016.10)
 ABC座 2017 ジャニーズ伝説 (2017.10)
 ABC座 2018 ジャニーズ伝説 (2018.10)

Concerts 
A.B.C-Z Kis-My-Ft2 First Concert (11-13 Oct, 8-9 Nov 2008)
Minna Crea ni Kite Kurie! (11–19 May 2010)
年末ヤング東西歌合戦！ 東西Jr.選抜大集合2010！ A.B.C-Z＋ジャニーズJr.選抜　VS　中山優馬＋関西Jr.選抜 (26-27 Nov 2010)
Minna Crea ni Kite Kurie 2011 (29 March- 5 May, 13–18 May, 23–29 May 2011)
A.B.C-Z 2011　first Concert in YOYOGI (6 Nov 2011)
A.B.C.-Z. and Sexy Zone Johnny's Dome Theater ~SUMMARY~
A.B.C-Z 2013 Twinkle×2 Star Tour (23 Mar 2013 - 25 May 2013)
Summer Concert 2014 A.B.C-Z★"Legend" (2014)
A.B.C-Z Early summer concert (2015)
Sexy Zone A.B.C-Z Summer Paradise in TDC (2015)
A.B.C-Z Star Line Travel concert (2016)
A.B.C-Z 5Stars 5Years Tour (2017)
A.B.C-Z Love Battle Tour (2018-2019)

Photobook 

 [2017.04.25] Itsutsu Hoshi (五つ星)

Event 

 A.B.C-Z 5stars CIRCUS in JOYPOLIS (2018)
A.B.C-Z 5stars Festival in JOYPOLIS (2019)

References

External links 
 
 A.B.C.-Z. at Johnny's Net website

Johnny & Associates
Japanese boy bands
Japanese pop music groups
Japanese idol groups
Pony Canyon artists
Musical groups established in 2005
2005 establishments in Japan